Ozothamnus is a genus of  plants found in Australia, New Zealand and New Caledonia.

The following is a list of species' names accepted by the Australian Plant Census as at January 2020:

Ozothamnus adnatus - winged everlasting
Ozothamnus alpinus - alpine everlasting
Ozothamnus antennaria
Ozothamnus argophyllus - spicy everlasting
Ozothamnus bidwillii
Ozothamnus blackallii  ( N.T.Burb.) Anderb. 
Ozothamnus bracteolatus
Ozothamnus cassinioides
Ozothamnus cassiope  (S.Moore) Anderb.
Ozothamnus conditus
Ozothamnus costatifructus
Ozothamnus cuneifolius - wedge everlasting, Wedge-leaf Everlasting
Ozothamnus cupressoides - scaly everlasting, kerosene bush
Ozothamnus decurrens
Ozothamnus diosmifolius (Vent.) DC. - rice flower, white dogwood, pill flower, sago bush
Ozothamnus diotophyllus
Ozothamnus ericifolius
Ozothamnus eriocephalus
Ozothamnus × expansifolius (P.Morris & J.H.Willis) Anderb.
Ozothamnus ferrugineus (Labill.) Sweet - tree everlasting   
Ozothamnus hookeri - kerosene bush
Ozothamnus kempei  (F.Muell.) Anderb. 
Ozothamnus ledifolius (A.Cunn. ex DC.) Hook.f. 
Ozothamnus lepidophyllus  Steetz. 
Ozothamnus leptophyllus - tauhinu, cottonwood (New Zealand)
Ozothamnus lycopodioides
Ozothamnus obcordatus - grey everlasting
Ozothamnus obovatus 
Ozothamnus occidentalis  (N.T.Burb.) Anderb. 
Ozothamnus pholidotus
Ozothamnus purpurascens
Ozothamnus reflexifolius
Ozothamnus reticulatus
Ozothamnus retusus
Ozothamnus rodwayi
Ozothamnus rodwayi subsp. kingii
Ozothamnus rodwayi var. oreophilus
Ozothamnus rodwayi var. rodwayi
Ozothamnus rogersianus (J.H.Willis) Anderb.
Ozothamnus rosmarinifolius
Ozothamnus rufescens 
Ozothamnus scaber
Ozothamnus scutellifolius 
Ozothamnus secundiflorus - cascade everlasting
Ozothamnus selaginoides 
Ozothamnus stirlingii - Ovens everlasting
Ozothamnus tesselatus 
Ozothamnus thyrsoideus
Ozothamnus tuckeri 
Ozothamnus turbinatus - coast everlasting
Ozothamnus vagans
Ozothamnus vauvilliersii - mountain cottonwood (New Zealand)
Ozothamnus whitei

References

External links
FloraBase - the Western Australian Flora: Ozothamnus
PlantNET - Flora of New South Wales Online: Ozothamnus

 
Asteraceae genera